The Super C was a high-speed intermodal freight train on the Atchison, Topeka and Santa Fe Railway from 1968 to 1976.

Overview 
The brainchild of company president John Shedd Reed, the Super C (led by a pair of EMD FP45s) made its first run on January 17, 1968, covering the distance in a record-breaking 37½ hours averaging . The second test train did the ride even faster in 34½ hours averaging . For an added fee of $1,400 per trailer shippers were guaranteed fast delivery.

Santa Fe tried high-speed freight operations on its Illinois Division in late 1966.  By year's end, passenger-geared GE U28CG locomotives took 19 piggyback cars from L.A.'s Hobart Yard to Chicago in 61 hours.  On June 8, 1967 a joint run using New York Central's Flexi-Van container cars traveled from New York City to Los Angeles in 54 hours, 21 minutes.  The Super C carried high-priority items such as auto parts and electronic components; the United States Post Office soon became a consistent customer. It was allowed .

Train length varied from one to 15 or 20 cars. In the end, too few shippers chose to pay for 40-hour delivery, especially considering that a standard TOFC load arrived in 15 hours more.  The final blow came in 1976 when the Santa Fe lost its mail contract to a joint venture of the Chicago and North Western Railway and the Union Pacific Railroad that could deliver at lower cost on a 50-hour schedule.

The Super C completed its last trip on May 20, 1976.

References

External links 
 ATSF FP45 90 — the history of the first locomotive to lead the Super C.
  At the Santa Fe Railway Historical & Modeling Society official website.

Atchison, Topeka and Santa Fe Railway
High-speed rail in the United States
Named freight trains